Pedro Pedrossian (13 August 1928 – 22 August 2017) was a Brazilian politician. A member of the Party of National Mobilization, he served two terms as the Governor of Mato Grosso do Sul. The first term (1980–83) was an appointed role, before being elected to office in 1991. His term ended in 1994. He also served as the Governor of Mato Grosso between 1966 and 1971. He was born in Miranda, Mato Grosso do Sul. A civil engineer by profession, he graduated from Mackenzie Presbyterian University, São Paulo.

Pedrossian died on 22 August 2017 in Campo Grande, at the age of 89.

References

1928 births
2017 deaths
Brazilian civil engineers
Governors of Mato Grosso
Governors of Mato Grosso do Sul
Party of National Mobilization politicians
Brazilian people of Armenian descent
Mackenzie Presbyterian University alumni
Brazilian Democratic Movement politicians
Democratic Labour Party (Brazil) politicians
Brazilian Labour Party (current) politicians
Democratic Social Party politicians
National Renewal Alliance politicians
Social Democratic Party (Brazil, 1945–65) politicians